The Château de Plain-Marais is an historic castle in Beuzeville-la-Bastille, Manche, Lower Normandy, France.

History
The castle was built during the Hundred Years' War.

It was the private residence of Olivier Le Clerc de Juigné, who served as a member of the Chamber of Deputies from 1815 to 1816.

Architectural significance
It has been designated as a monument historique since 1975.

References

External links
Official website

Châteaux in Manche
Monuments historiques of Manche